Bellaspira acclivicosta is a species of sea snail, a marine gastropod mollusk in the family Drilliidae.

Description

Distribution
This species occurs in the Pacific Ocean off Mexico and Panama.

References

External links
 
 McLean, James H., and Leroy H. Poorman. Reinstatement of the turrid genus Bellaspira Conrad, 1868 (Mollusca: Gastropoda) with a review of the known species. Los Angeles County Museum of Natural History, 1970

acclivicosta
Gastropods described in 1970